Mount Sumagaya is a mountain on the northern section of Mindanao in the Philippines. It is under the  jurisdictional territory of the municipality of Claveria.

It is part of the Central Mindanao Cordillera that stretches from Camiguin in the north to Sarangani in the south. The mountain rose to prominence after the crash of Cebu Pacific Flight 387 on its slopes in 1998, one of the deadliest aviation incidents in the Philippines.

See also
 List of active volcanoes in the Philippines
 List of potentially active volcanoes in the Philippines

References

Sumagaya
Landforms of Misamis Oriental